Battle of Warsaw may refer to:

Northern War battles
 Battle of Warka (April 7, 1656)
 Siege of Warsaw (1656), Warsaw retaken by Poles from Swedes on June 30, 1656
 Battle of Warsaw (1656), battle outside the city on July 18–20, 1656
 Battle of Warsaw (1705), fought on July 31, during the Great Northern War
 Battle of Praga (1705), fought on 25 October, during the Polish–Swedish War (1701–1706)

Partition and Napoleonic wars
 Warsaw Uprising (1794), better known as the Insurrection of Warsaw
 First Battle of Warsaw (1794), during the Kościuszko Uprising
 Battle of Praga or Second Battle of Warsaw (1794), during the later Kościuszko Uprising
 Battle of Raszyn (1809), during the Polish-Austrian War

November Uprising
 First Battle of Wawer, February 19–20, 1831
 Battle of Olszynka Grochowska, February 25, 1831
 Second Battle of Wawer, March 31, 1831
 Battle of Warsaw (1831), September 6–8

World War I and Polish-Soviet War battles
 Battle of the Vistula River or the Battle of Warsaw (1914), during World War I
 Battle of Warsaw (1915), during World War I
 Battle of Warsaw (1920) August 13–16, 1920, during the Polish-Soviet War
 Battle of Radzymin (1920), one theatre of the Battle of Warsaw

World War II battles
 Battle of Warsaw (1939), siege of Warsaw during the Invasion of Poland, at the outset of World War II
 Warsaw Ghetto Uprising (1943), fought in what is now the Muranow district during World War II
 Battle of Radzymin (1944), a clash between Soviet and German tank armies
 Warsaw Uprising or Battle of Warsaw (1944)
 Battle of Warsaw (1945), part of Vistula–Oder Offensive